Euromanis ("european pangolin") is one of the earliest known pangolin genera. It lived during the Eocene in Europe. Euromanis fossils found in the Messel Pit in Germany. Unlike modern pangolins, it did not bear scales on its body.

Phylogeny 
Phylogenetic position of genus Euromanis within order Pholidota.

References 

Prehistoric pangolins
Eocene mammals
Myrmecophagous mammals
Prehistoric placental genera
Cenozoic mammals of Europe
Fossil taxa described in 1994